Biathlon at the 1999 Asian Winter Games took place in the Provincial Nordic venue, around the resort town of Yongpyong, Kangwon, South Korea with six events contested — three for men and three for women.

Schedule

Medalists

Men

Women

Medal table

Participating nations
A total of 34 athletes from 5 nations competed in biathlon at the 1999 Asian Winter Games:

References
Results of the Fourth Winter Asian Games
China secures most medals

External links
Schedule

 
1999 Asian Winter Games events
1999
Asian Games
Biathlon competitions in South Korea